The Basan (波山), alternatively referred to as Basabasa (婆娑婆娑) or Inuhōō (犬鳳凰), is a fowl-like bird with origins stemming from Japanese mythology and folklore and illustrated in Takehara Shunsen's Ehon Hyaku Monogatari and the Gazu Hyakki Yagyō.

Mythology
It is said to live in the mountains of Iyo Province (today Ehime Prefecture). According to the description on the illustration, it resembles a large chicken and breathes ghost-fire from its mouth. It is described as having a bright red cockscomb and spits an equally brilliant-hued fire. The fire is a cold fire, a glow, and it does not burn.

It usually lives in the bamboo groves of mountain recesses but sometimes materializes in human villages late at night. When the Basan flaps its wings, an eerie rustling ("basa basa") sound can be heard. Supposedly, if a human hears the sound and looks outside, the bird's form will suddenly vanish.
It is sometimes depicted with blue hackles and claws, green regimes and sickle feathers, and a red body. It is also sometimes called the "Fire Rooster".

In Popular Culture
The Pokémon family of Torchic, Combusken, and Blaziken are based on the Basan, as well as Magmar.

See also
Cockatrice

References

Legendary birds
Yōkai
Fictional chickens
Mythological galliforms